Alexander James Ashburner Nix (born 1 May 1975) is a British businessman, the former CEO of Cambridge Analytica and a former director of the Strategic Communication Laboratories (SCL) Group, a behavioural research and strategic communications consultancy, leading its elections division (SCL Elections). Cambridge Analytica and its parent SCL were involved in psychological warfare operations for the British military and involved in influencing hundreds of elections globally; Cambridge Analytica helped Leave.EU with its Brexit campaign, according to both Leave.EU and Cambridge Analytica staff. The company was also engaged by the Ted Cruz and Donald Trump campaigns during the 2016 US presidential election. The company also ran Kenyan President Uhuru Kenyatta's campaign.

A member of the Ashburner-Nix family of Crawley, Nix grew up in Notting Hill, attended Eton and studied art history. Nix started his career as a financial analyst with Baring Securities in Mexico before moving to the strategic communication industry and joining SCL Group, a private intelligence company active in the military and political arenas founded by Nigel Oakes and whose president was former Conservative minister Sir Geoffrey Pattie; Nix's father was also a co-owner of SCL. In 2013 he became CEO of SCL's new subsidiary Cambridge Analytica. The men behind Cambridge Analytica and its parent SCL were described as having close ties to the Conservative Party (UK), the British royal family and the British military, and included some of the Conservative Party's largest donors, and former Conservative minister Jonathan Marland, Baron Marland. The company provided advice to the Foreign Office and Nix met with Boris Johnson in 2016.

Both in the UK and the US campaigns, Cambridge Analytica used private information from over 87 million Facebook users harvested from their profiles without permission. In 2018 Cambridge Analytica was dissolved after undercover video footage showed Nix claiming his company was using honey traps, bribery stings, and prostitutes, among other tactics, to influence more than 200 elections globally for his clients. In 2019 Nix and his colleague Aleksandr Kogan settled with the Federal Trade Commission, agreeing to delete previously obtained data; in 2020, Nix agreed to a disqualification undertaking prohibiting him from running U.K. limited companies for seven years after permitting companies to offer potentially unethical services, while denying any wrongdoing.

Early life

Alexander James Ashburner Nix was born on 1 May 1975 to a banking family that belonged to the English landed gentry and had close ties to British colonial history both in the West Indies and British India, the Ashburner-Nix family of Crawley and London; Nix is mainly of English descent, and has some Black Jamaican ancestry in the 19th century as well as ancestors born in India and Peru. His father Paul David Ashburner Nix (1944–2006) was an investment manager who spent twenty-seven years with the M&G Group before joining Consulta in 1995, and was a shareholder of SCL Group.

Alexander Nix grew up in Notting Hill, in West London, attended Eton College, and studied art history at the University of Manchester.  He started his career as a financial analyst with Baring Securities in Mexico for Robert Fraser & Partners LLP, a tax and corporate finance firm. In 2003, Nix left finance to work in the strategic communication industry with the SCL Group.

Family and personal life
In 2010 Nix married Olympia Paus, a wealthy Norwegian shipping heiress.

Career

Cambridge Analytica
In 2013, Nix set up Cambridge Analytica as an offshoot of the SCL Group, to target voters in "more than 40 political campaigns in the US, Caribbean, South America, Europe, Africa and Asia". The company ran Uhuru Kenyatta's presidential campaign in Kenya. In the United States, it was involved in the 2014 midterm elections and the 2016 presidential primaries and election, during which it received funding from the Mercer family. Nix's firm supported both the Ted Cruz and Donald Trump campaigns for the US presidency by using "psychographic" profiles of voters built on data harvested from Facebook.

In an exposé of the company, Nix was filmed stating that "we are not only the largest and most significant political consultancy in the world, but we have the most established track record. We're used to operating through different vehicles, in the shadows" and offered a "secretive relationship."

Before the 2016 United Kingdom European Union membership referendum, Nix's firm was involved in supporting Leave.EU with its Brexit campaign, according to both Arron Banks of Leave.EU, former Cambridge Analytica employee Christopher Wylie, Cambridge Analytica's business development director Brittany Kaiser, and Leave.EU's communications director Andy Wigmore.

During Boris Johnson's tenure as foreign secretary, the Foreign Office sought advice from Cambridge Analytica and Boris Johnson had a meeting with Alexander Nix in 2016.

According to Wigmore, the work for Leave.EU was done pro bono, without any money changing hand: "Because Nigel [Farage] is a good friend of the Mercers. And Robert Mercer introduced them to us. He said, 'Here's this company we think may be useful to you.' What they were trying to do in the US and what we were trying to do had massive parallels. We shared a lot of information. Why wouldn't you?" Behind Trump's campaign and Cambridge Analytica, he said, were "the same people. It's the same family."

In February 2018, Nix told the British parliament's Digital, Culture, Media and Sport Committee that his company had not received data from Facebook; following further media reports the committee's chairman, Damian Collins, said "We will be contacting Alexander Nix next week asking him to explain his comments." Nix denies deliberately misleading the parliamentary Select Committee.

In March 2018, The Observer reported that Nix talked "unguardedly about the company's practices" when he was secretly filmed by Channel 4 News reporters posing as prospective clients and that Cambridge Analytica was trying to stop the broadcast of the resulting programme. Nix offered "beautiful Ukrainian girls" to discredit political opponents in Sri Lanka. The secret filming was screened on 19 March as part of a 30-minute segment, with a follow-up scheduled for the next day, focusing on its involvement in the Trump campaign. The conversation appears to portray Nix including entrapment and bribery as potential Cambridge Analytica services.

On 20 March 2018, Nix was suspended from Cambridge Analytica.

On 11 April 2018, The Wall Street Journal published an article about the CEO position at Cambridge Analytica, saying Nix "has officially resigned from his position, according to a person close to the company", but also that a "company spokesman ... denied that Mr. Nix had submitted his resignation".

On 2 May 2018, Cambridge Analytica announced they were "closing and starting insolvency proceedings".

Christopher Wylie described Nix as "born in the wrong century" and "the type of person that would have been ideal at the height of the British Empire to go and become a governor of a colony, because he's the right station and class and went to Eton and all that."

On 8 October 2018, The Guardian reported that Nix referred to Mia Mottley, the elected Prime Minister of Barbados, and other government figures via the racial slur of "Niggers" in email communications.

Emerdata 
On 23 January 2018, Nix was appointed director of Emerdata Ltd., a new company incorporated in August 2017, along with SCL chairman Julian Wheatland and Cambridge Analytica chief data officer Alexander Tayler. On 16 March 2018, Rebekah and Jennifer Mercer were also appointed directors, members of the Mercer family which backed Cambridge Analytica financially (by at least $15 million, according to the New York Times). Another director of Emerdata is Chinese businessman , deputy chairman and executive director of Frontier Services Group, a private security firm which mostly operates in Africa and is chaired by US businessman and strong Trump supporter Erik Prince, who is best known for founding private military group Blackwater USA and being the brother of US education secretary Betsy DeVos. On 13 April 2018, Nix's role of director was terminated.

FTC settlement and disqualification from running UK limited companies
In 2019 Nix and his colleague Aleksandr Kogan settled with the Federal Trade Commission, agreeing to delete previously obtained data.

In 2020 Nix signed a disqualification undertaking, accepted by the UK Secretary of State on 14 September 2020. The Insolvency Service commented that "Within the undertaking, Alexander Nix did not dispute that he caused or permitted SCL Elections Ltd or associated companies to market themselves as offering potentially unethical services to prospective clients; demonstrating a lack of commercial probity." The unethical services offered included "bribery or honey trap stings, voter disengagement campaigns, obtaining information to discredit political opponents and spreading information anonymously in political campaigns." Effective from 5 October 2020, Alexander Nix is disqualified for seven years from acting as a director or directly or indirectly becoming involved, without the permission of the court, in the promotion, formation or management of a UK company. Nix said he had made "no admission of wrongdoing" or broken any laws.

In popular culture
Nix has been compared to "a Bond villain" with "the sinister-sounding surname, the cut-glass accent and his position at the centre of a conspiracy theory involving Brexit, Trump and dodgy data."

Nix is portrayed by Paul Bettany in an upcoming film on the Cambridge Analytica affair produced by the Russo brothers.

See also
Russian interference in the 2016 Brexit referendum

References

1975 births
British people of Jamaican descent
Living people
English chief executives
Donald Trump 2016 presidential campaign
2016 United Kingdom European Union membership referendum
Alumni of the University of Manchester
People educated at Eton College
People from Notting Hill
People associated with the 2016 United States presidential election
Cambridge Analytica